Bill Hicks (18 September 1899 – 21 September 1962) was an Australian rules footballer who played with Fitzroy in the Victorian Football League (VFL).

Notes

External links 
		

1899 births
1962 deaths
Australian rules footballers from Victoria (Australia)
Fitzroy Football Club players